Arkéa Pro Cycling Team is a French women's road bicycle racing team which participates in elite women's races. The team was established in 2020.

Team roster

Major results
2020
Stage 6 Tour de l'Ardèche, Pauline Allin
Topolcianky Cyclo-cross, Anaïs Morichon

2021
Chambéry road race, Gladys Verhulst
Boulzicourt Cyclo-cross, Amandine Fouquenet
Quelneuc Cyclo-cross I, Amandine Fouquenet
Quelneuc, Cyclo-cross II, Amandine Fouquenet
Bagnoles-de-l'Orne Cyclo-cross I, Amandine Fouquenet
Bagnoles-de-l'Orne Cyclo-cross II, Amandine Fouquenet
La Grandville Cyclo-cross, Léa Curinier

National Champions
2021
 France Cyclo-cross, Amandine Fouquenet
 France Track (Madison), Marie-Morgane Le Deunff
2022
 France U23 Road Race, Amandine Fouquenet

References

External links

UCI Women's Teams
Cycling teams based in France
Cycling teams established in 2020